The 1922 Buffalo All-Americans season was their third in the league. The team failed to improve on their previous output of 9–1–2. They finished ninth in the league.

Schedule

Standings

References

Buffalo All-Americans seasons
Buffalo All-Americans
Buffalo All-Americans